Olufemi Hakeem Gbajabiamila   (born 25 June 1962), is a Nigerian lawyer and politician. A member of the All Progressives Congress (APC), Gbajabiamila has served as Speaker of the House of Representatives since 2019.

Early life and education
Olufemi "Femi" Hakeem Gbajabiamila was born on 25 June 1962 to Lateef Gbajabiamila and Olufunke Gbajabiamila in Lagos, Nigeria. He attended Mainland Preparatory School for elementary education and Igbobi College in 1973, where he completed his secondary education. Subsequently, he enrolled at King William's College on the Isle of Man, United Kingdom for his A-Level. He was accepted into the University of Lagos, Nigeria. He graduated with a Bachelor of Law (LL.B.) with honors in 1983 and was called to the Nigerian bar in 1984.

He first worked for the law firm, Bentley Edu & Co., in Lagos, before establishing his own law firm, Femi Gbaja & Co. He then earned his Juris Doctor from Atlanta's John Marshall Law School in Georgia, USA, passed the Georgian bar exam in 2001, and set up a law firm in Atlanta. While in the USA, he actively participated in the election of Bill Campbell who later went on to become Mayor of Atlanta.

Political career 
Gbajabiamila was first elected to the House of representatives in 2003, he represents the Surulere I constituency of Lagos State.

Gbajabiamila has criticized members of the National Assembly for switching parties. He suggested that many voters don't have access to the information to make choices based on every individual stance, and therefore, sometimes vote for candidates based on their party alignment. He criticized floppers with this in mind, saying the effect "cannot be anything but negative."

Gbajabiamila was the Minority Leader of the House of Representatives in the 7th National Assembly. He was head of the House of Representatives ad hoc committee investigating claims by the Asset Management Company of Nigeria (AMCON) about the 140.9bn naira (about $1Bn) debt owed by 'Zenon Petroleum & Gas Limited' and 'Forte Oil Plc'. The call for an investigation of the reported payment was made by another lawmaker, Bimbo Daramola who moved the motion that the House set up a panel to verify the claims by AMCON that the Femi Otedola-owned two companies have paid back the money which the government of Nigeria paid for petroleum products reportedly not delivered as agreed upon by the dictates of the government's fuel subsidy scheme.

Bimbo Daramola had suspected that the payment, if truly made, was "shrouded in secrecy." He was elected speaker in the 9th National Assembly House of Representative with 283 votes while his opponent Mohammed Umar Bago came Second with 78 votes.

Corruption allegations
After the passage of the Petroleum Industry Bill (PIB) in August 2021, Gbajabiamila and other legislators were accused of receiving bribes to guarantee the legislation's advancement despite significant public opposition to parts of the text. According to Peoples Gazette reporting, at least $10 million was paid to legislators in payments organized by Minister of State for Petroleum Resources Timipre Sylva and Akwa Ibom North-East Senator Bassey Albert Akpan with between $1.5 million and $2 million going to both Gbajabiamila and Senate President Ahmad Lawan.

Multiple legislators corroborated the story with several legislators expressing anger, not that the Gbajabiamila and Lawan allegedly took bribes but instead that the bribes were not shared equally among the legislators as other legislators claimed to have received $5,000 for representatives and $20,000 for senators. Gbajabiamila, Lawan, Sylva, and Akpan all declined to comment on the story.

Awards
In October 2022, a Nigerian national honour of Commander of the Order of the Federal Republic (CFR) was conferred on him by President Muhammadu Buhari.

See also

References

External links

1962 births
Speakers of the House of Representatives (Nigeria)
Members of the House of Representatives (Nigeria)
20th-century Nigerian lawyers
Living people
Nigerian Muslims
Action Congress of Nigeria politicians
People from Lagos
People educated at King William's College
Atlanta's John Marshall Law School alumni
University of Lagos alumni
Residents of Lagos